The 2022–23 Dayton Flyers men's basketball team represented the University of Dayton in the 2022–23 NCAA Division I men's basketball season. They were led by head coach, Anthony Grant, in his sixth season with the Flyers. The Flyers played their home games at UD Arena in Dayton, Ohio as members of the Atlantic 10 Conference.

Previous season
The Flyers finished the 2021–22 season 24–11, 14–4 in A-10 play to finish in a tie for second place. As the No. 2 seed in the A-10 tournament, they defeated UMass in the quarterfinals before losing in the semifinals to Richmond. They were one of the last four teams not selected for the NCAA Tournament and received an at-large bid to the National Invitation Tournament. There they defeated Toledo in the first round before losing in the second round to Vanderbilt.

Offseason

Departures

Incoming transfers

2022 recruiting class

Roster

Schedule and results

|-
!colspan=12 style=| Exhibition

|-
!colspan=12 style=| Non-conference regular season

|-
!colspan=12 style=| Atlantic 10 Regular Season

|-
!colspan=12 style=| A-10 tournament

Source:

Rankings

*''AP does not release post-NCAA Tournament rankings.

References

Dayton Flyers men's basketball seasons
Dayton
2022 in sports in Ohio
2023 in sports in Ohio